Willie Ben Jones (born 1953) is an American serial killer who killed at least three sex workers in Richmond, Virginia between 1980 and 1991. During his trial, Jones said he committed the murders since the victims "had to be punished" for being sex workers. He later pleaded guilty to three counts of second degree murder and received three consecutive 20-year sentences.

Early life 
Since the early 1970s, Jones had "a significant history of violent behavior when he has been drinking. Alcohol led to a significant and well-documented series of violence." His alcoholism resulted in assault arrests, seizures, and hostile behavior.

Murders, trial, and imprisonment 
On October 6, 1980, Jones picked Ronald Jones, 31, a crossdresser, and took him to his apartment. After realizing Ronald was a man, Jones fatally stabbed him and dumped his body behind the apartment building. On November 19, 1981, Jones strangled 24-year-old Marinda Zimmerman after she slapped him during an argument. In March 1990, he strangled 36-year-old Shirley Marie Jones.

Jones would also confess to killing 33-year-old Priscilla Louise Leeper on September 29, 1988, but he was not prosecuted in this case.

Jones was apprehended in November 1990 after he turned himself in. He walked into a police station in Northern Virginia and confessed to four murders. When they didn't arrest him, Jones walked inside the FBI headquarters and confessed once more. His confessions to the murders of Ronald, Marinda, and Shirley were substantiated and he was charged in their deaths.

During Jones's trial, Richmond Detective Steve A. Dalton quoted him as having killed his victims since "they had to be punished." On March 27, 1991, Jones pleaded guilty to three counts of second degree murder. On May 14, 1991, he received the maximum sentence of 60 years, 20 years for each count of second degree murder. Under Virginia's three-strikes law, Jones was declared ineligible for discretionary parole since he'd been convicted of three violent separate crimes. However, he became eligible for geriatric parole after turning 60. Jones has been denied early release every time.

Jones is currently serving his sentence at Lunenburg Correctional Center. Barring parole, he will be released from prison on December 24, 2025.

See also 
 List of serial killers in the United States

References 

1953 births
1980 murders in the United States
1981 murders in the United States
1990 murders in the United States
American people convicted of murder
American serial killers
Crimes against sex workers in the United States
Living people
Male serial killers
People convicted of murder by Virginia
Violence against women in the United States